Peng, or Pengzhen, is a town under the jurisdiction of Shuangliu District, Chengdu, Sichuan Province, China.

History

The ancient name of Pengzhen was Yongfengchang. It was built in the Yongle period of the Ming Dynasty. It was destroyed by Bingxian in the early Qing Dynasty and rebuilt in the 28th year of Qianlong (1763). Because a branch of the Danleng Peng Duanshu family migrated here, it was named Pengjiachang.

After the Communist Party of China came to power in 1949, Pengjia Town of the Third District was established. In 1953, Pengjia Town was divided into Pengzhen and Pengzhen Township. In 1958, Pengzhen’s organizational structure was dissolved, and Pengzhen Township, Ca'er Township, Hongshi Township and Ganzi Township were merged to form the Dongfeng People’s Commune.

Pengzhen Township was re-established in 1983. The name reverted to Pengzhen in 1984. In 1992, Pengzhen and Ganzi Township merged, and the merged township is still named Pengzhen. In December 2019, the town of Jinqiao (金桥镇) was dissolved and its administrative area was placed under the jurisdiction of Pengzhen.

Government 
The Pengzhen People's Government town hall is located at No. 70, Section 3, Jiaotong Road.

Administrative divisions
Peng is divided into sixteen residential communities and six administrative villages.

The town's sixteen residential communities are:

 Pengjiachang Residential Community
 Randeng Residential Community
 Yangping Residential Community
 Guangrong Residential Community
 Jinwan Residential Community
 Qiyang Residential Community
 Ganzi Residential Community
Xingfu Residential Community
Muxi Residential Community
Hongshi Residential Community
Kunshan Residential Community
Xin'an Residential Community
Lianyu Residential Community
Heshui Residential Community
Bushi Residential Community
Jinqiao Residential Community
The town's six administrative villages are:

 Minjiang Village
 Yonghe Village
 Jinma Village
 Jinhe Village
 Linjiang Village
 Zhoudu Village

In popular culture
Peng, including the Peng Old Teahouse, was used as a principal filming location in the 2020 Chinese language film "Interloper".

References

History of Chengdu
Towns in Sichuan
Geography of Chengdu